The Royal League was an annual Scandinavian football tournament held three times between teams from the three Scandinavian monarchies (Denmark, Sweden, and Norway), starting after the end of the regular domestic seasons of Norway and Sweden. Denmark, however, was in mid-season when the tournament started. The four best-placed teams in the football leagues of Denmark, Norway and Sweden participate in the tournament.

There was discussion of expanding the league, and include the winners of Veikkausliiga and 
Landsbankadeild, which are the Finnish and the Icelandic premier divisions.

The 2007–08 edition was cancelled for financial reasons.

History
For the 2004–05 Royal League tournament, the twelve participating teams were initially placed into three groups. The two best-placed teams from each country were placed in the same group, while the two other teams were placed in the two other groups. In each group, each team played against the other three teams, home and away. The two best-placed teams of each group were randomly placed into two new groups. The three teams of each new group played each other, home and away. The 2005 Royal League Final was contested on 26 May 2005, by Swedish team IFK Gothenburg and FC Copenhagen from Denmark. FC Copenhagen won the title following a penalty shootout.

In the second season of the tournament, the twelve participating teams were also divided into three preliminary groups. The two best-placed teams of each group, and the two best third-placed teams went on to play quarterfinals. The rest of the tournament was played in a knockout-system. The quarter-finals and semi-finals were played both at home and away, while there was only a single final game to decide the winner. The 2006 Royal League Final was contested on 6 April 2006, by FC Copenhagen and Lillestrøm from Norway. FC Copenhagen won their second title, when Razak Pimpong scored to 1–0 in the last minutes of the game.

For the 2006–07 Royal League tournament, the structure of initial group stage and subsequent knockout-stage was kept. As opposed to the previous edition of the tournament, the knock-out stages were played as single games, with the team having the best group stage record earning home field advantage. The 2007 Royal League Final was contested on 15 March 2007, by Danish team Brøndby IF and FC Copenhagen. Brøndby won 1–0, on a penalty kick converted by Martin Ericsson.

The league has received quite a lot of criticism since the first season. The teams rarely bother to play with their best side, and this leads to a lack of interest. Raising the award money and/or giving direct place in the UEFA Champions League have been suggested as ways to improve the situation.

The 2007–08 edition was cancelled for financial reasons, but the board planned to resurrect the tournament for the 2008–09 season. On 11 October 2008 it was announced that the 2008–09 season would not be held either, as the TV rights for the tournament had not been sold.

There were however plans for a tournament in 2010, but under a new name; Royal Cup.

Finals

All-time table by country

See also
 Allsvenskan
 Danish Superliga
 Tippeligaen
 Nordic Football Championship
 Baltic League
 Nordic Cup

References

External links
 Official site
 Royal League Live Scores, Fixtures and Results
 Results, RSSSF

 
Defunct international club association football competitions in Europe
Sport in Scandinavia
Football competitions in Denmark
Football competitions in Norway
Football competitions in Sweden
Recurring sporting events established in 2004
Recurring events disestablished in 2007
Inter-Nordic sports competitions